Sir Philip Meadowes or Meadows (1672–1757) was an English politician and diplomat.

Life
He was baptised on 21 May 1672, the second son of Sir Philip Meadows of Chattisham, Suffolk and his wife Constance Lucy. He studied at Trinity College, Oxford, matriculating 1689, and at Lincoln's Inn which he entered in 1690.
 
He was a commissioner of excise from 1698 to 1700. He was on 2 July 1700 appointed Knight Marshal of the king's household, and was knighted by William III on 23 December 1700 at Hampton Court. His position as Knight Marshal was bought from Lord Jersey.

In December 1706 Meadowes succeeded James Stanhope as envoy to Holland. He was in 1707 despatched on a special mission to Emperor Joseph I, and during his absence was appointed controller of army accounts; in November 1708 he presented a memorial to the Emperor in favour of the Protestants of Silesia. He was succeeded by Lord Raby in August 1709.

Later Meadowes resided at Richmond, Surrey. He died at Brompton on 5 December 1757.

Family
Meadowes married Dorothy Boscawen, sister of Hugh Boscawen, 1st Viscount Falmouth. They had three sons and five daughters, including:
Sidney (1699-1792)
Philip (1708–1781)

Notes

External links
Attribution

1672 births
1757 deaths
English MPs 1698–1700
People from Babergh District
Ambassadors of Great Britain to the Holy Roman Emperor
Members of the Parliament of England for Truro
English MPs 1702–1705
English MPs 1705–1707